Ytalo Rodulfo Manzo Santos (born 4 August 1974) is a Peruvian football manager and former player who played as a goalkeeper.

After playing mainly for Peruvian Segunda División sides, Manzo started working as a goalkeeping coach, being also an interim manager at Unión Comercio and Sport Boys. For the 2022 season, he was definitely appointed manager of the latter.

References

External links

1974 births
Living people
People from Puno Region
Peruvian footballers
Association football goalkeepers
Coronel Bolognesi footballers
Atlético Universidad footballers
Deportivo Municipal footballers
Peruvian football managers
Peruvian Primera División managers
Deportivo Binacional FC managers
Sport Boys managers
Unión Comercio managers